Charlie Rhindress (born May 9, 1966) is an actor, writer, director and producer living in his hometown of Amherst, Nova Scotia. He was educated at Mount Allison University and is a co-founder and former Artistic Director of Live Bait Theatre, based in Sackville, New Brunswick. 

To date Rhindress has had seventeen of his plays produced, including The Maritime Way of Life, which was nominated for a Canadian Comedy award as best new play, and Flying On Her Own, based on the life of the late Canadian singer/songwriter, Rita MacNeil. The latter was published by Playwrights Canada Press in 2008. Three of Rhindress's plays have been produced at Ship's Company Theatre in Parrsboro, Nova Scotia: Ivor Johnson's Neighbours (2009), The Maritime Way of Life (2012) and Making Contact (2013). Charlie has also written or co-written more than 30 dinner theatre scripts. 

The Canadian Encyclopedia says that Rhindress's work "suggests that New Brunswick is fertile ground for popular comedy. Of particular note is Rhindress's The Maritime Way of Life (1999), a dark satire on traditional East Coast lifestyles and personalities. Despite its vicious sarcasm, extensive cross-dressing, and absurd humour, The Maritime Way of Life is very popular with Atlantic audiences." 

His first book, I'm Not What I Seem - The Many Stories of Rita MacNeil's Life, was published by Formac Publishing in 2016. It was a bestseller in the Maritimes and was short listed for the Best First Book Award from the Atlantic Books Awards. His second book, Stompin’ Tom Connors: The Myth and the Man, was released in September of 2019 and has also appeared on multiple bestseller lists. 

Rhindress has acted in over fifty productions at theatres across Canada. His film and television credits include Red Rover, Black Eyed Dog, Trailer Park Boys, Haven, Mr. D, and Chapelwaite. He also starred in a very popular television commercial for Pro-Line which aired for over two years.

His directing credits include the premiere of Cathy Jones' one woman show, Me, Dad and the Hundred Boyfriends at Theatre Passe Muraille in Toronto and The Compleat Wrks of Wllm Shkspr (abridged) at Neptune Theatre in Halifax, for which he received a Merritt award nomination as Best Director. 

He is the former Associate Artist for Neptune and a former Artistic Producer of Eastern Front Theatre.

Much of Rhindress's career has been spent telling the stories of Canada's Maritime provinces and its people. In addition to his works about Rita MacNeil and Stompin' Tom Connors he has written about The Great Amherst Mystery and a famous murder case from Sackville, New Brunswick. He has adapted novels from Maritime writers Charles G.D. Roberts and Bruce Graham for the stage. He helped create Esther Fest, a celebration of Esther Cox and The Great Amherst Mystery in his hometown of Amherst, N.S. In Sackville, N.B. he helped establish the Sackville Arts Wall. He has also worked extensively with The Anne Murray Centre creating and presenting special events, including The Maritime Music Fest. In 2019 he created a musical tribute to Rita MacNeil, "I'm Not What I Seem," which has toured Nova Scotia and New Brunswick. 

Rhindress has been awarded the New Brunswick Arts Award of Merit for contribution to the Cultural Life of NB, a Lifetime Achievement Award from Playwrights Atlantic Resource Centre for his contributions to Atlantic Canadian Theatre, and an Established Artist Recognition Award from the Province of Nova Scotia.

Works

Plays

 Guilty! The Story of the Great Amherst Mystery (1991, revised 1993)
 Elvis Presley Is Alive and Well and Living in Sackville (1992)
 A Christmas Carol (1992)
 It's a Wonderful Christmas (1993)
 Gates Motel (1994)
 Under the Night (1996) with composer/lyricist Dean Burry
 The Maritime Way of Life (1997, revised 1999) 
 Flying On Her Own (2000, revised 2004) featuring the songs of Rita MacNeil
 Home and Away (2003) with composer/lyricist Dean Burry
 The Heart That Knows (2008) with composer/lyricist Dean Burry (adapted from the novel by Charles G.D. Roberts)
 Ivor Johnson's Neighbours based on the novel by Bruce Graham (2009)
 Boo (2009)
 Making Contact (2013)
 Selfie (2015) with original music by Alex Rhindress
 Reader Be Thou Also Ready (2015) based on the novel by Robert James
 The War of Conditioning (March 2019)
 Life Happens (Premiered online July 2020)

Books
 I'm Not What I Seem - The Many Stories of Rita MacNeil's Life (2016)
 Stompin’ Tom Connors: The Myth and the Man - An Unauthorized Biography (2019)

References

External links

Charlie Rhindress Website

Living people
1966 births
Canadian male film actors
Canadian male television actors
20th-century Canadian dramatists and playwrights
21st-century Canadian dramatists and playwrights
People from Amherst, Nova Scotia
People from Sackville, New Brunswick
Male actors from Nova Scotia
Male actors from New Brunswick
Canadian male dramatists and playwrights
20th-century Canadian male writers
21st-century Canadian male writers